Radeem Haslam (born 8 March 1991), better known by his professional name Bena Di Senior or, in shorthand, as Di Senior, is a Jamaican record producer & entrepreneur based in Kingston, Jamaica. Bena is one of the most multi-talented Producer, Composer & Engineer in the music industry today. Whether making beats or recording, Bena has been hailed for his brilliance so far in creating some of the most authentic productions throughout the years.

Biography

Early life and career
Raised by his mother along with his younger brothers, sister, cousins, aunt and other relatives in Kingston. He attended Kingston Technical High School. Following a computer studies in the 11th grade, and after realizing his true talent was making beats, young Bena began making beats on his computer at home and considered music production as a career. Bena Di Senior began promoting himself via Social Networking websites such as Facebook, Twitter, Hi5 and Myspace and also events in his community and at school. Radeem also known a Bena "Di Senior" at a young age has always had a passion for music at his early stages. Singing with his mother and dad after school every evening, both his parents used to play cassettes while they all sang or Deejay. During school like Bena was a drama student while in school, Singing and acting in front of hundreds of people, he carried on his passion for the arts of music throughout High School. He had made great accomplishments while in primary school by being best Actor and Best Singer throughout the whole school years.

In 2009, he met Icon, CEO of Icon Music Group and also one of the producers responsible for some of the hit songs for Vybz Kartel, Mavado (singer) & more which introduced him partially to the musical world. Bena is also well known by his signature tag, a short whisper of "Bena" followed by short delays, at the beginning and at the ending of his Beats / Riddim. In late 2009, Bena released his first solo record since childhood with Alliance Next Generation (ANG) Kalado on a riddim he produced himself.

Production style
Bena has said in radio interviews & online blogs that he admires songwriters such as Stevie Wonder for his instrumentation.  He also stated that he draws inspiration from producers such as Di Genius, Timbaland, Young Chop, Mike Will, Lex Lugar and The Neptunes for their instantly recognisable production styles.

Equipment-wise, Bena stated that he started out producing with a single drum machine MPC, but has since moved on to multiple MPCs, keyboards, and a variety of audio editing programs, including Pro Tools, Reason and Fruity Loops.

Creating Hits
Cj King Entertainment has features the young dancehall Producer out of Jamaica "Bena" on their website for 2 consecutive weeks because of his different production style in his riddim." In the year 2011 young dancehall icon Bena Di Senior has launched his official website which was designed by himself. Bena Production has also create hit music that went No. 1 on YarkLink254. Bena Producer compose buzzing single in Jamaica, Badness Inna We Longtime.

2014–: Bad Dawgs Riddim

On 12 April 2014, Bena released the long anticipated "Bad Dawgs Riddim" produced by himself. Signature for its hard hitting synth laden juggling with an exciting artist line-up featuring Denno, Ding Dong (reggae musician), Kalado, Strent and Versatile.

2017-: Stylez By Di Senior
Year 2017 was so far one of the most successful years for the producer himself where doing business as usual. The introduction of Stylez By Di Senior the dancehall producer's clothing and accessories one stop store.

Works
Bena Di Senior has listed a number of dancehall and rap artist that he has worked with from the start of his career via his Facebook page.

Future Fambo
 Zhand-High
 Versatile
 MillionDalla Capo 
 Tarnado
 Ding Dong
 Wayne Marshall
 Kalado
 Recruit
 New Money
 Natural Black
 Ikanji
 Strent
 Jah Marcus
 Robert Ffrench
 Natty King
 Patexxx
 Voicemail
 Shokryme
 Branxx
 Eklypse
 Mama's Girl
 Quick Cook
 Cubanis
 Fyakin
 Bruno Moon
 Dane Ray
 Squaddy
 Don Andre
 King David
 Kananga
 Syyyntex
 Rae Tay
 Voltage
 Kari Jess
 Xplosion
 King Asar
 Cornelius Grant
 Neutron Obliv
 Eldie Anthony
 Denno
 Shaddai Smith
 Tactical
 Vision
 Jula
 Vision Lineage

Discography
Studio singles & albums
 2009: Crime Scene Riddim – Featuring (Various Artist)
 2010: Nuh Seh Nuttin – Watch Di Way She Whine
 2011: Kalado – Provide "Frass Vybz Riddim"
 2012: Blue Square Riddim – Featuring (Various Artist)
 2013: Strent Ft. Ding Dong – Mad Up Di Party – Featuring (Bomb Shop Records)
 2013: Under Control Riddim – Featuring (Y-Not Production)
 2013: Deh Deh – Proud A Mi Money
 2013: Strent – Big Spliff
 2014: Bad Dawgs Riddim – Featuring (Various Artist)
 2015: Conversion Riddim – Featuring (Various Artist)

Chart singles

Filmography

Awards and nominations

HDP Music Awards
The HDP Music Awards were established in 2012 by DJ Frass Vybz to celebrate dancehall performers, producers and music video directors.

Influences
In various interviews & blog posts, Bena (Producer) has named a number of musical influences on his own production work.

Dancehall / Reggae
Stephen Di Genius Mcgregor
Sly & Robbie
Philip "Fatis" Burrell
Tony "CD" Kelly
Don Corleon
Jordon Mclure & Isle Mclure (Chimney Records)

Hip Hop
Ace Hood
Future (rapper)
Rick Ross
Meek Mill
T.I
Safaree Samuels

Hip Hop / Rap Producers
Young Chop
Mike Will Made It
Lex Luger (record producer)
Timbaland
Dr. Dre
Track Bangas
40 OVO
London on da Track

References

External links
Bena Di Senior at Twitter
Bena Di Senior at Facebook
Bena Di Senior Official Website

1991 births
Living people
People from Kingston, Jamaica
Jamaican dancehall musicians
Jamaican male singers
Jamaican record producers